Noonan (and ) is an Irish surname.

People
Notable people with the surname Noonan include:

Aileen Noonan (born 1950), Irish chess master
Bill Noonan, (1947-2021), New Zealand rugby league international
Brian Noonan (born 1965), retired National Hockey League player
Buddy Noonan (1937–1989), American cinematographer, actor, and entertainer
Carol Noonan, folksinger
Chris Noonan (disambiguation), various people
Chris Noonan (born 1952), Australian filmmaker
Chris Noonan (academic), a New Zealand law academic
Christine Noonan (1945–2003), British actress
Desmond Noonan (1951–2005) and Dominic Noonan (born 1966), former Manchester mobsters
Diana Noonan (born 1960), New Zealand children's author
Edward Noonan (disambiguation), various people
Edward A. Noonan (1852–1927), mayor of St Louis, USA
Edward C. Noonan (born 1948), American politician
Edward Thomas Noonan (1861–1923), American politician from Illinois
Edward Noonan (architect) (born 1930), Chicago architect and developer
Frederick Noonan (1893–missing 1937, declared dead 1938), aviator who accompanied Amelia Earhart on her ill-fated last flight 
Jacqueline Noonan (1928–2020), American pediatric cardiologist 
John T. Noonan Jr. (1926–2017), American judge
Katie Noonan (born 1977), Australian singer and songwriter 
Michael Noonan (disambiguation)
Michael Noonan (Fine Gael politician) (born 1943), Irish Fine Gael politician
Michael J. Noonan (Fianna Fáil politician) (1935–2013), Irish Fianna Fáil politician and Minister for Defence
Nick Noonan (disambiguation)
Nick Noonan, American baseball player and infielder in the Oakland Athletics organization. He has also played in Major League Baseball (MLB) for the San Francisco Giants and the San Diego Padres
Nick Noonan (musician), member of musical duo Karmin
Pat Noonan (born 1980), American soccer (football) player
Paddy Noonan (1875 – 1935), Australian rules footballer 
Peggy Noonan (born 1950), author and primary speech writer for Ronald Reagan
Robert Noonan, writer under the pseudonym Robert Tressell
Ros Noonan (born 1946), New Zealand politician and trade unionist, later Human Rights Commissioner
Sinéad Noonan (born 1987), Irish model, actress and Miss Ireland 2008 
Thomas Noonan (disambiguation), various people
Tommy Noonan (1921–1968), American television and film actor
Thomas S. Noonan (1938–2001), American historian, anthropologist and Slavicist
Thomas P. Noonan, Jr. (1943–1969), American Marine lance corporal 
Tom Noonan (born 1951), American film, television and theater actor-writer 
Thomas Noonan (musician) (born 1974), American drummer
Wade Noonan (born 1971), Australian politician

Places
Noonan, New Brunswick, Canada, a small community
Noonan, Missouri, a ghost town
Noonan, North Dakota, a city

See also
Nunan
Noonan syndrome, named after Jacqueline Noonan

Surnames of Irish origin